Shinji Takahashi may refer to:

, Japanese religious leader
, Japanese baseball player
, Japanese sport shooter
, Japanese volleyball player